In computer science, hash trie can refer to:

 Hash tree (persistent data structure), a trie used to map hash values to keys
 A space-efficient implementation of a sparse trie, in which the descendants of each node may be interleaved in memory. (The name is suggested by a similarity to a closed hash table.)  
 A data structure which "combines features of hash tables and LC-tries (Least Compression tries) in order to perform efficient lookups and updates"

See also 
 Hash array mapped trie
 Hashed array tree
 Merkle tree

References

Trees (data structures)